{{DISPLAYTITLE:C19H21N3O5}}
The molecular formula C19H21N3O5 (molar mass: 371.38 g/mol) may refer to:

 Darodipine, a calcium channel blocker
 Isradipine, a calcium channel blocker

Molecular formulas